Rick Heller is an American baseball coach and former shortstop, who is the current head baseball coach of the Iowa Hawkeyes. Heller played college baseball at Upper Iowa for head coach Bill Prochaska from 1982 to 1986. He then served as the head Upper Iowa Peacocks (1988–1999), the Northern Iowa Panthers (2000–2009) and the Indiana State Sycamores (2010–2013).

Head coaching record
Below is a table of Heller's yearly records as a collegiate head baseball coach.

See also
List of current NCAA Division I baseball coaches

References

Living people
Upper Iowa Peacocks baseball players
Upper Iowa Peacocks baseball coaches
Northern Iowa Panthers baseball coaches
Indiana State Sycamores baseball coaches
Iowa Hawkeyes baseball coaches
Upper Iowa Peacocks football players
Upper Iowa Peacocks men's basketball players
American men's basketball players
Year of birth missing (living people)
High school baseball coaches in the United States
Baseball coaches from Iowa